St. Paul's College is a Roman Catholic College on the Fort Garry campus of the University of Manitoba.

History
St. Paul's College on the University of Manitoba campus is the major Catholic higher education institution in Manitoba.

In 1926 the Oblate Fathers, with a staff of six and a student body of one hundred, opened St. Paul's College as the first English Catholic High School for boys in the Province of Manitoba. Fr. Alphonse Simon, OMI was the first Rector. There was a rapid increase in students and the building on Selkirk Avenue soon proved inadequate. In 1931 Archbishop Sinnott, who had worked tirelessly to get the college started from as early as 1916, purchased the old Manitoba College (which had opened in 1882) at the corner of Ellice and Vaughan Streets in downtown Winnipeg and the college moved to this new location. The direction of the college passed into the hands of the diocesan clergy and Fr. C. B. Collins was appointed Rector. In the same year, the college became affiliated with the University of Manitoba.

The University of Manitoba, as founded in 1877, was a federation of three denominational colleges: St. Boniface (Catholic), St. John's (Anglican), and Manitoba (Presbyterian). In 1888 Wesley College (Methodist) became affiliated. On October 27, 1931, at the time of its affiliation, St. Paul's had a staff of 15 (eight priests and seven laymen), and a total of twelve students in the university program. The University of Manitoba Yearbook for 1932, The Brown and Gold, displays the photographs of the first two graduates of the college.

At the request of the Archbishop, the Jesuit Fathers undertook direction of the college in 1933. Fr. John Holland, S.J., was appointed Rector, and Fr. Erle Bartlett, S.J. was appointed Dean of Studies. Their photographs and those of their successors line the corridor of the administrative wing of the college. In 1936, St. Mary's College for Women became the women's division of St. Paul's, until the college opened on the Fort Garry campus in 1957 when it became co-educational and St. Mary's eventually withdrew from university work.

The facilities available to the College on Ellice Avenue were never fully adequate. Largely through the generosity of Mrs. Margaret Shea, a new unit, Paul Shea Hall, had been erected, providing a separate High School building in 1932. In 1939, six more classrooms were added and paid for through the Archdiocese and generous friends of the college. By the mid-1940s, students were being turned away because of the lack of space. A building fund drive at that time was not particularly successful and attention was turned again to relocating on the University of Manitoba campus with whom ongoing negotiations about relocation had been taking place. Following a pressing invitation from the university in 1954, there was much discussion and finally a decision was made in 1956 to accept the university's offer. In 1957 a 99-year lease for land on the campus was signed and a cornerstone was laid and blessed by Archbishop Pocock. At that ceremony, the Honourable Mr. Miller, Minister of Education, speaking on behalf of the government, congratulated the college for undertaking the move and added to the Archbishop's blessing "if you want governmental blessing, you have it." The Canada council contributed $100,000 towards the construction costs. The architect was Mr. Peter Thornton; the contractors were Wallace and Aikens.

In the fall of 1958, the basic buildings and administrative offices containing classrooms, library, cafeteria, faculty offices, and the chapel were ready for the first students. About 200 registered that year.

In 1962 the Science Wing was added, containing well-furnished laboratories, further class rooms, and faculty offices. The student cafeteria was extended in 1964 and the Residence of the Jesuit Fathers was added. 1972 saw the construction of a library, a theatre to seat 200, and the addition of further classroom and faculty office space. A larger library and a student residence were part of the original plan, but were never constructed.

Presently the college is under the direction of the St. Paul's Corporation and an 18-person Board of Governors. The Archbishop of Winnipeg is the College Chancellor.

The new millennium saw the construction of the Arthur V. Mauro Centre for Peace and Justice - an addition that provides graduate and undergraduate studies in peace-building and conflict-resolution.

Scholarships and bursaries
The Government of Canada sponsors an Aboriginal Bursaries Search Tool that lists over 680 scholarships, bursaries, and other incentives offered by governments, universities, and industry to support Aboriginal post-secondary participation. St. Paul's College scholarships for Aboriginal, First Nations and Métis students include: Sundance Aboriginal Student Award.

Arthur V. Mauro Institute
The Arthur V. Mauro Institute (formerly the Arthur V. Mauro Centre) at St. Paul's College, University of Manitoba, is dedicated to the advancement of human rights, conflict resolution, global citizenship, peace, and social justice through research, education, and outreach.

The Mauro Institute's initial emphases has been the cultural, religious, and philosophical dimensions of peace; social, economic, and environmental justice; peace education; human rights; and the role of international organizations and standards in the quest for peace and justice. The institute is also interested in the role of the Abrahamic religions of Judaism, Christianity, and Islam in pointing ways for people to live in peace and harmony in a post-modern world.

The Joint M.A. Program in Peace and Conflict Studies (governed jointly by the University of Manitoba and the University of Winnipeg) is housed at the Mauro Centre (U of M) and the Global College (U of W).

The institute is home to the University of Manitoba's Ph.D. Program in Peace and Conflict Studies, which seeks to prepare leaders in a multiplicity of contexts who make a difference locally, nationally, and globally.

Storytelling for Peace and Renewing Community (SPARC) is an initiative of the Institute that encompasses the Winnipeg International Storytelling Festival: Storytelling on the Path to Peace; the Youth Forum on Human Rights, Peace, and Social Justice; a 6-credit master's-level Summer Institute on Storytelling for Peace and Human Rights; and the Mauro Centre Storytelling Working Group.

Near Eastern and Biblical Archaeology Laboratory
The Near Eastern and Biblical Archaeology Laboratory (NEBAL) was established in 2010 by St. Paul's College at the University of Manitoba. The goal is to have a single integrated location for the study of the ancient cultures of the Near East and eastern Mediterranean. It provides a focus for seminars and lectures related to Near Eastern and Biblical Studies at the University of Manitoba. All related archaeological remains scattered throughout the university are being gathered in this location for analysis and curation. NEBAL also provides a single integrated research and administrative facility for faculty and students.

Fr. Harold Drake Library

The Fr.Holland Library at St. Paul's College focuses on supporting the teaching and research needs of staff and students at St. Paul's College including the University One programme, the Jesuit Centre for Catholic Studies and the Arthur V. Mauro Centre for Peace and Justice.

The Library holds over 70,000 volumes including the following special collections.

Catholic Studies: Theology and history of the Catholic Church, contemporary Catholic issues.
Medieval Studies
Philosophy (including Bernard Lonergan)
Peace and Conflict Studies
History (European, British, Canadian)
French literature (20th century) and English literature

The Fr. Harold Drake Library offers a full range of library services including access to the entire University of Manitoba Libraries collections, reference and reserve services, patron print, scanning and photocopying. The Library's collections and services are open to all University of Manitoba Libraries patrons.

Catholic Studies Program
The historical relationships and ongoing encounters that the members of the Roman Catholic Church have had with disciplines such as history, the arts and sciences, as well as human thought comprise the framework around which the Catholic Studies program is formed.

The Catholic Studies program at St. Paul's College was designed as an interdisciplinary unit that fosters an intellectual and academic approach to Catholicism. It seeks to explore the Catholic tradition in ways that do justice to its full contributions and challenges as a historical and contemporary phenomenon. In order to provide crucial perspectives on the Catholic culture, the program itself includes the findings of many academic disciplines such as Religion, History, Fine Arts, and Philosophy.

The Catholic Studies Program's goal is to study, explore, and engage Catholicism in all its social, political, and religious complexities. The program is aimed at students who wish to pursue Catholic Studies as a minor as well as for those students who only want to take one or two courses that would expand and deepen their understanding of Catholicism.

St. Paul's College Students' Association
The St. Paul's College Students' Association (SPCSA) consists of students pursuing any program of study at U of M, who are registered members of the college. SPCSA members are elected annually by students. Its purpose is to organize and promote events and special initiatives, and represent students' interests (academic, spiritual, and social).

Events are planned throughout the year such as a Welcome Back BBQ, Sibling Rivalry BBQ with St. John's College, Back to School Bash, Valentine's Day Bash, St. Patrick's Day Bash, and closing ceremonies.

See also
 List of Jesuit sites

References

Bibliography
 
 Bumsted, Dr. John M (Jack). The University of Manitoba: An Illustrated History (Winnipeg: University of Manitoba Press, 2001)

External links
 

University of Manitoba
Catholic universities and colleges in Canada
Catholic Church in Manitoba
Roman Catholic schools in Manitoba
Manitoba, Paul
1926 establishments in Manitoba
Distance education institutions based in Canada